Sparah is the name of Virgin Mobile USA's summer 2011 marketing campaign. Its name is the combined names of Spencer Falls and Sarah Carroll, two complete strangers chosen from obscurity to be manufactured into a celebrity couple for the company's marketing campaign. The two were introduced in a series of commercials, print ads, and a web series.

Since the launch of the campaign, Sparah has received significant media attention, having appeared on pop culture websites and magazines.

References

External links 
 Sparah YouTube Channel
 Virgin Mobile Live Facebook Page
 Spencer Falls YouTube Channel
 Sarah Carroll YouTube Channel
 http://sparah.com/sparah%e2%84%a2-gets-in-the-holiday-spirit-with-santa/

Advertising campaigns
Advertising in the United States